In mathematics, in the field of group theory, a subgroup  of a group  is said to be weakly normal if whenever , we have .

Every pronormal subgroup is weakly normal.

References
 
 

Subgroup properties